West Salem High School may refer to:
West Salem High School (Salem, Oregon) in Salem, Oregon
West Salem High School (Wisconsin) in West Salem, Wisconsin